Modaressi may refer to:

 Hadi al-Modarresi (born 1947), Iraqi ayatollah
 Mohammad Taqi al-Modarresi (born 1945), Iraqi Grand Ayatollah, brother of Hadi